Josephat Ababu Sorongo (born 15 April 1980) is a former Kenyan cricketer. He is a paceman who returned to the Kenyan cricket squad for the 2004 ICC Champions Trophy after a three-year absence along with Brijal Patel, Rageb Aga and Malhar Patel, having impressed with his bowling earlier in the year against Pakistan's A team.

Ababu became one of the few bowlers to take a wicket with his first ever delivery in a One Day International when he dismissed Neil Johnson, during the Kenya v Zimbabwe match in Nairobi in 1999.

1980 births
Kenyan Luhya people
Living people
Kenyan cricketers
Kenya One Day International cricketers
Northern Nomads cricketers
People from Kakamega